Area codes 208 and 986 are the area codes in the North American Numbering Plan for all of Idaho. Area code 208 is one of the 86 original area codes created by AT&T in 1947. It was Idaho's sole area code until 2017, when 986 was added as an overlay plan for the entire state.

Because of its small population, Idaho was among a declining number of North American jurisdictions with only one area code.  It is also one of the few whole-state area codes split between multiple LATAs—Southern Idaho (centered in Boise and spilling into Nevada, Wyoming and Malheur County, Oregon) and Coeur d'Alene (spilling into Montana and Washington).  Additionally, the Spokane, Washington LATA spills into central Idaho.

In 2001, the Federal Communications Commission projected that demand would exhaust the numbering pool of area code 208 in 2003. The number shortage was a result of the proliferation of landlines, cellphones, and pagers, particularly in urban areas, in the 1990s. However, in 2002 the Idaho Public Utilities Commission (IPUC) successfully delayed a split by implementing number pooling in Boise; this was later applied in 2007 to the rest of Idaho to stave off projected exhaustion in 2010.

In the summer of 2013, NANPA projections suggested exhaustion in 2018. By this time all conservation measures had been exhausted. With Idaho's population growing closer to two million, a second area code became necessary; eleven other states with single area codes all have populations of about one million each. Ultimately, a statewide overlay was recommended. This would have had the effect of assigning 15.6 million numbers to a state of just over 1.7 million people. However, the Idaho PUC wanted to spare Idahoans, particularly in rural areas, the expense and burden of having to change their numbers. An area code split would have also required en masse reprogramming of cell phones. In the overlay plan, subscribers with numbers in the original area code can keep it.

On November 2, 2015, the Idaho PUC approved the addition of area code 986 as a statewide overlay. 986 officially entered service on November 5, 2016. On that date, a permissive dialing period began during which it was possible to make calls with either seven or ten digits (the latter with the area code first). Ten-digit dialing became mandatory across Idaho on August 5, 2017; failure to dial the area code caused an intercept message as reminder.  986 is the second statewide overlay, following the example of area codes 304 and 681 in West Virginia.

List of exchanges
 Aberdeen (208) 397 844
 Albion (208) 654 673
 American Falls (208) 220 226 269
 Arco (208) 527
 Ashton (208) 652
 Blackfoot (208) 604 643 680 681 684 690 782 785 789
 Boise (208) 202 229 246 247 248 258 272 275 279 283 284 286 287 288 297 302 319 321 322 323 327 330 331 332 333 334 336 338 340 341 342 343 344 345 348 350 353 361 362 363 364 367 368 371 373 375 376 377 378 379 381 383 384 385 386 387 388 389 391 392 393 395 396 401 407 409 412 422 424 426 429 433 439 440 441 445 447 460 472 473 474 484 485 488 489 492 493 514 515 545 559 562 567 570 571 573 575 577 581 602 608 629 631 639 658 672 685 692 693 694 695 703 706 713 723 724 728 730 761 780 789 794 822 830 841 846 850 853 854 855 859 860 861 863 866 867 869 870 871  880 884 887 888 890 891 893 895 898 901 906 908 914 917 918 919 921 922 938 939 941 947 949 954 955 957 968 975 977 978 979 988 991 994 995 999 
 Bonners Ferry (208) 267 295
 Burley (208) 203 219 261 312 586 647 650 670 677 678 808
 Caldwell (208) 402 453 454 455 459 649 779 965
 Carey (208) 823
 Challis (208) 879
 Clark Fork (208) 266
 Clayton (208) 838
 Coeur d'Alene (208) 215 218 277 292 415 416 444 446 449 620 625 640 641 651 659 660 661 664 665 666 667 676 691 699 704 714 755 758 763 765 769 770 771 797 818 819 889 929 930 952 956 964 966
 Council (208) 253
 Emmett (208) 365 369 398 477 963
 Firth (208) 346
 Fruitland (208) 452 566 570 707
 Garden Valley  (208) 462
 Glenns Ferry  (208) 366
 Grace  (208) 425
 Grand View  (208) 834
 Grangeville  (208) 983
 Hailey (208) 209 450 471 481 578 594 622 720 721 725 726 727 788 806
 Homedale (208) 337
 Idaho Falls (208) 200 201 204 206 227 243 313 403 419 520 521 522 523 524 525 526 528 529 533 534 535 542 552 557 569 592 709 719 757 818 821 881 932 980
 Jerome (208) 210 316 320 324 329 593 595 644 933 944 948
 Lewiston (208) 298 299 305 413 503 553 621 717 743 746 748 750 790 791 792 798 799 816 848
 Mackay (208) 588
 Malad (208) 766
 Marsing (208) 896
 McCall (208) 271 315 469 491 630 632 634 905
 Melba-Murphy (208) 495
 Meridian (208) 288 401 412 631 695 706 822 846 855 870 871 884 887 888 893 895 898 955
 Middleton (208) 585
 Montpelier, Idaho (208) 847
 Moore (208) 554
 Moscow (208) 216 301 310 596 669 874 882 883 885
 Mountain Home (208) 580 587 590 591 598 599 828 832
 Nampa, Idaho (208) 463 467 880 899
 New Plymouth (208) 278
 Orofino (208) 476
 Parma (208) 674 722
 Paul (208) 438
 Paris, Idaho (208) 945
 Payette (208) 642 741
 Pine-Featherville (208) 653
 Plummer (208) 686
 Pocatello (208) 213 220 221 223 226 232 233 234 235 236 237 238 239 240 241 242 244 251 252 254 269 282 317 339 380 406 417 425 427 478 479 530 540 547 565 589 637 646 648 705 708 747 760 775 776 833 840 851 852 897 904 909 915
 Ponderay (208) 263
 Post Falls (208) 457 773 777 618
 Potlatch (208) 875
 Rexburg (208) 351 356 359 360 390 656 716 
 Rockland (208) 548 
 Rigby, Idaho (208)745
 Ririe, Idaho (208)538
 Rupert, Idaho (208) 436
 Saint Anthony (208) 624
 Sandpoint (208) 255 263 265
 Shelley (208) 357
 Soda Springs (208) 547
 St. Maries, Idaho  (208) 245
 Stanley, Idaho  (208) 
 Teton  (208)  372 458
 Tipanuk  (208) 796
 Twin Falls (208) 210 212 280 293 308 316 320 324 329 352 358 404 410 420 421 423 490 536 537 539 543 544 593 595 644 731 732 733 734 735 736 737 738 749 751 814 825 829 837 886 933 934 944 948 961 969
 Wallace (208) 556 752 753
 Weiser (208) 414 549 550
 Wilder (208) 482
 Premium numbers: 1+(208/986) 976.

See also

List of NANP area codes

References

External links

208
208
Telecommunications-related introductions in 1947